The Carabinier is a traditional cultural dance from Haiti that originated back to the time of the Haitian Revolution deriving from a section of the kontradans that is said to have evolved into the méringue or mereng (Haitian Creole) dance.

Origins
Just after the Revolution of 1804, European figure dances (contredanse, lancers, and the quadrille), accompanied by Kongo influences (chica, banboula and the kalenda), hybridized into a couples dance named after the Carabiniers rifle regiments in the Haitian army.

References

Haitian dances